Polskie Zoo was a popular Polish satirical TV program, produced by Marcin Wolski, and aired every Saturday night by Telewizja Polska station TVP1 between 1991–1994. It was focused on the political reality and the leading politicians in the country; and arranged as a puppet show with animals living in a Zoo. The screenplay was written by Marcin Wolski with puppets designed by Jacek Frankowski. The music was composed by Włodzimierz Korcz.

Puppets featured in the Zoo

References

External links

Polish cabarets
1991 establishments in Poland
1994 disestablishments in Poland
Polish satirical television shows
Polish television shows featuring puppetry
1991 Polish television series debuts